Gail King may refer to:
A misspelling of television journalist Gayle King
The 2009 winner of the Ms. Senior America Pageant